The Jack of Diamonds is a 1949 British adventure film directed by Vernon Sewell and starring Nigel Patrick, Cyril Raymond and Joan Carroll. Its plot follows an ex-soldier who persuades some yacht owners to help recover a treasure chest of jewels he hid off the Belgian coast in 1940 during the Second World War.

Cast
 Nigel Patrick - Alan Butler 
 Cyril Raymond - Roger Keen 
 Joan Carroll - Joan Keen 
 Dolly Bouwmeester - Giselle 
 John Basings - Parsons 
 Darcy Conyers - Colin Campbell 
 Vernon Sewell - Engineer 
 Edwin Richfield - George Paxton 
 Guy Romano - Douamier

Critical reception
TV Guide gave the film two out of four stars, and wrote, "this well-paced effort takes full advantage of its characterizations and the high seas background."

References

External links

1949 films
1949 adventure films
British adventure films
Films set in Belgium
Films set in England
Films directed by Vernon Sewell
British black-and-white films
Seafaring films
Treasure hunt films
1940s English-language films
1940s British films